Daşca (also, Dashdzha, Dashtydzha, and Tash-diza) is a village and municipality in the Qabala Rayon of Azerbaijan.  It has a population of 747.

References 

Populated places in Qabala District